MIRI, or the Mid-Infrared Instrument, is an instrument on the James Webb Space Telescope. MIRI is a camera and a spectrograph that observes mid to long infrared radiation from 5 to 28 microns. It also has coronagraphs, especially for observing exoplanets. Whereas most of the other instruments on Webb can see from the start of near infrared, or even as short as orange visible light, MIRI can see longer wavelength light.

MIRI uses silicon arrays doped with arsenic to make observations at these wavelengths. The imager is designed for wide views but the spectrograph has a smaller view. Because it views the longer wavelengths it needs to be cooler than the other instruments (see Infrared astronomy), and it has an additional cooling system. The cooling system for MIRI includes a Pulse Tube precooler and a Joule-Thomson Loop heat exchanger. This allowed MIRI to be cooled down to a temperature of 7 kelvins during operations in space.

MIRI was built by the MIRI Consortium, a group that consists of scientists and engineers from 10 different European countries (The United Kingdom, France, Belgium, the Netherlands, Germany, Spain, Switzerland, Sweden, Denmark and Ireland) with the United Kingdom heading the European consortium,  as well as a team from the Jet Propulsion Lab in California, and scientists from several U.S. institutions.

Overview
The spectrograph can observe wavelengths between 4.6 and 28.6 microns, and it has four separate channels, each with its own gratings and image slicers. The field of view of the spectrograph is 3.5 by 3.5 arcseconds.

The imager has a plate scale of 0.11 arcseconds/pixel and a field of view of 74 by 113 arcseconds. Earlier in development the field of view was going to be 79 by 102 arcseconds (1.3 by 1.7 arcmin). The imaging channel has ten filters available and the detectors are made of arsenic-doped silicon (Si:As). The detectors (one for the imager, and two for the spectrometer) each have a resolution of 1024x1024 pixels, and they are called Focal Plane Modules or FPMs.

During 2013 and finishing in January 2014, MIRI was integrated into the Integrated Science Instrument Module (ISIM). MIRI successfully passed Cryo Vac 1 and Cryo Vac 2 tests as part of ISIM in the 2010s. MIRI was developed by an international consortium.

MIRI is attached to the ISIM by a carbon-fiber and plastic hexapod structure, which attaches it to the spacecraft but also helps thermally isolate it. (see also Carbon fiber reinforced plastic)

Parts summary:
Spectrometer optics
Spectrometer Main Optics (SMO)
Spectrometer Pre Optics (SPO)
Focal Plane Arrays
Input-Optics Calibration Module (IOC)
Pick-off Mirror
Calibration source for Imager
Contamination Control Cover (CCC)
CFRP hexapod
Imager
Image slicers
Deck

Most of MIRI is located in the main ISIM structure, however the cryocooler is in region 3 of ISIM which is located in the spacecraft bus.

The imager module of MIRI also includes the Low Resolution Spectrometer that can perform long-slit and slitless spectroscopy from 5 to 12 μm light wavelength. The LRS uses Ge (germanium) and ZnS (zinc sulfide) prisms to cause spectroscopic dispersion.

Commissioning is complete as of the following dates:

 Imaging, 06/17/2022
 Low resolution spectroscopy, 06/24/2022
 Medium resolution spectroscopy, 06/24/2022
 Coronagraphic imaging, 06/29/2022

Cryocooler
To allow mid-infrared observations within the JWST, the MIRI instrument has an additional cooling system. It works roughly similar to how most refrigerators or an air-conditioner works: a fluid is brought down to a cold temperature in the warm section, and sent back to the cold section where it absorbs heat, then it goes back to the condenser. One source of heat is the left-over heat of the spacecraft, but another is the spacecraft's own electronics, some of which are close to the actual instruments to process data from observations. Most of the electronics are in the much warmer spacecraft bus, but some of the electronics needed to be much closer, and great lengths were taken to reduce the heat they produce. By reducing how much heat the electronics make on the cold side, then less heat needs to be removed.

In this case the JWST cryocooler resides in the spacecraft bus and it has lines of coolant that run to the MIRI instrument, chilling it. The cryocooler has a heat radiator on the spacecraft bus to emit the heat it collects. In this case the cooling system uses helium gas as the refrigerant.

The James Webb Space Telescope's cryocooler is based originally on the TRW ACTDP cryocooler. However, the JWST has had to develop a version to handle higher thermal loads. It has a  multi-stage pulse tube refrigerator that chills an even more powerful cooler. That is a  linear-motion Oxford-style compressor that powers a J-T loop. Its target is to cool the MIRI instrument down to 6 kelvins (−448.87 °F, or −267.15 °C). The ISIM is at about 40 K (due to the sunshield) and there is a dedicated MIRI radiation shield beyond which the temperature is 20 K. The J-T loop is a Joule–Thomson loop heat exchanger.

Filters 

MIRI has 10 filters available for observations.
 F560W - Broadband Imaging
 F770W - PAH, broadband imaging
 F1000W - Silicate, broadband imaging
 F1130W - PAH, broadband imaging
 F1280W - Broadband imaging
 F1500W - Broadband imaging
 F1800W - Silicate, broadband imaging
 F2100W - Broadband imaging
 F2550W - Broadband imaging
 F2550WR - Redundant filter, risk reduction
 FND - For bright target acquisition
 Opaque - Darks

Diagrams

See also
Spitzer Space Telescope (NASA's mid-infrared space telescope launched in 2003, it could not see as deep into the infrared when its coolant supply was depleted in 2009)
Wide-field Infrared Survey Explorer (infrared survey telescope)
List of largest infrared telescopes (includes examples of space observatories that have designed for similar wavelengths)
Jovian Infrared Auroral Mapper (IR Imaging spectrometer on Juno Jupiter orbiter)
Infrared Array Camera (Spitzer near to mid infrared camera)

References

External links

ESA - MIRI - the mid-infrared instrument on JWST
Presentation on MIRI's coronographs (.pdf)
The Mid-Infrared Instrument for JWST, II: Design and Build - Wright, et al (long paper on Miri)
MIRI Encyclopedia at University of Arizona
NASA - JWST Cryocooler

Spectrographs
Space imagers
James Webb Space Telescope instruments